George Freeman may refer to:
 George W. Freeman (1789–1858), Episcopal bishop in America
 George Freeman (bookmaker) (1935–1990), Australian racing identity
 George Freeman (comics) (born 1951), Canadian comic book penciller, inker, and colorist
 George Freeman (cricketer) (1843–1895), English first-class cricketer
 George Freeman (guitarist) (born 1927), jazz guitarist
 George Freeman (newspaper editor), Irish-American newspaper editor
 George Freeman (politician) (born 1967), Member of UK Parliament for Mid-Norfolk
 George Freeman (pianist), American jazz pianist, composer, and producer